Valentini Grammatikopoulou (born 9 February 1997) is a Greek tennis player. On 22 August 2022, she reached her best singles ranking of world No. 143. On 28 February 2022, she peaked at No. 118 in the WTA doubles rankings. She has won a singles title on the WTA Challenger Tour, and in addition, 12 singles and 25 doubles titles on the ITF Women's Circuit. 

Playing for Greece Fed Cup team, Grammatikopoulou has a win–loss record of 15–9 in Fed Cup competitions.

Professional career
She made her Grand Slam debut at the 2021 US Open as a qualifier, after attempting to qualify 12 times for a major. It marked the first time ever that three Greek players were in the US Open main draw. On her major debut, she reached the second round after defeating Anna Blinkova, 6-3, 6-2. It was just her third career win at the WTA Tour-level. As a result, she moved close to 50 spots up the rankings reentering the top 200.

She qualified for her second Grand Slam tournament at the 2022 French Open, marking her debut at this major.

In August 2022, she won her to date biggest title at the WTA 125 Vancouver Open, defeating Lucia Bronzetti in the final, in straight sets.

Performance timelines

Only main-draw results in WTA Tour, Grand Slam tournaments, Fed Cup/Billie Jean King Cup and Olympic Games are included in win–loss records.

Singles
Current after the 2023 United Cup.

Doubles

WTA career finals

Doubles: 1 (runner-up)

WTA Challenger finals

Singles: 1 (title)

Doubles: 1 (runner-up)

ITF Circuit finals

Singles: 24 (12 titles, 12 runner–ups)

Doubles: 48 (25 titles, 23 runner–ups)

References

External links

 
 
 

1997 births
Living people
Sportspeople from Kilkis
Greek female tennis players